Shock Troop (German title:Stoßtrupp 1917) is a 1934 German war film directed by Hans Zöberlein and starring Ludwig Schmid-Wildy, Beppo Brem and Max Zankl. It shows German soldiers fighting in the trenches during the First World War. It was based on the novel Der Glaube an Deutschland by Hans Zöberlein.

Cast
 Ludwig Schmid-Wildy ...  Hans Steinbauer 
 Beppo Brem ...  Girgl
 Toni Eggert ...  Toni 
 Max Zankl ...  Heiner 
 Hans Pössenbacher ...  Anderl 
 Karl Hanft ...  Martl 
 Heinz Evelt ...  Max 
 Hans Erich Pfleger ...  Karl + Capitaine 
 Georg Emmerling ...  Gustl 
 Albert Penzkofer ...  Der Unteroffizier 
 Ludwig Ten Cloot ...  Der Kompanieführer 
 Hans Schaudinn ...  Der Feldwebel 
 Hans Franz Pokorny ...  Der Major 
 Harry Hertzsch ...  Der Leutnant 
 Matthias Olschinsky ...  Der General 
 Eberhard Kreysern ...  Der Stabsmajor 
 Leopold Kerscher ...  Der Funker 
 Peter Labertouche ...  Der Engländer

References

External links

1934 films
1934 war films
German war films
1930s German-language films
Western Front (World War I) films
Films of Nazi Germany
German black-and-white films
1930s German films